Fortuna 1975 Lelydorp is a Surinamese football club based in Lelydorp, Suriname. They currently participate in the Surinamese Eerste Klasse, the second-highest tier of football in Suriname.

References

Fortuna 75
Fortuna 75
Lelydorp